Leslie David Boundy (12 August 1932 – 18 July 2003) was an Australian politician who represented the South Australian House of Assembly seat of Goyder from 1974 to 1977 for the Liberal Movement and Liberal Party.

See also
1974 Goyder state by-election

References

 

1932 births
2003 deaths
Members of the South Australian House of Assembly
20th-century Australian politicians